Supernanny is a British reality television programme about parents struggling with their children's behaviour, mealtime, potty training, etc. The show features professional nanny Jo Frost, who devotes each episode to helping a family where the parents are struggling with child-rearing. Through instruction and observation, she shows parents alternative ways to discipline their children and regain order in their households. Frost is a proponent of the "naughty chair" theory of discipline and is strictly opposed to hitting and spanking.

The programme aired on Channel 4 from 7 July 2004 to 8 October 2008. A follow-up programme titled Jo Frost: Extreme Parental Guidance ran from 9 February 2010 to 5 August 2012. Supernanny has been adapted in other countries, including an American version (also with Jo Frost).

History
Supernanny was originally broadcast in the UK on Channel 4 on 7 July 2004, following the success of Channel 4's Cutting Edge programme "Bad Behaviour." Supernanny is one of Channel 4's most popular shows, reaching nearly 5 million viewers in the first series, with consistently high ratings throughout the series.

The premiere episode for the third series attracted 3.1 million viewers with a 14% audience share. These values are half of those from the previous two series.

Reception
In their book Handbook of Psychological Assessment, Case Conceptualization, and Treatment, Children and Adolescents, Michel Hersen and David Reitman state, "With considerable skill, Super Nanny Jo Frost implements standard, evidence-based contingency management procedures, as well as heavy evidence of creating alternative positive activity structures." The show has had its critics, and not all child-care experts agree with her approach. Some people find that the children's right to privacy has been violated and that children are embarrassed when put on the "naughty step". Newcastle University media and cultural-studies lecturer Tracey Jensen believes that the format results in the mother being "shamed before she is transformed".

The show, viewed by six million people in its first year, was an "instant success." Shows were created in 48 countries by 2014 that were tailored after Supernanny.

Home media
A DVD release of Supernanny entitled When Little Kids Cause Big Headaches was released in the UK on 12 April 2010.

Episodes

International versions
Supernanny has been broadcast or slightly adapted in other countries.

References

External links
 
 

2004 British television series debuts
2008 British television series endings
British reality television series
Channel 4 original programming
English-language television shows
Parenting television series
Television series by Warner Bros. Television Studios
Works about child care occupations